D. Murugesan is an Indian politician from Anakaputhur. He was a member of the 14th Tamil Nadu Legislative Assembly from the Chengalpattu constituency, representing the Desiya Murpokku Dravida Kazhagam party.

The elections of 2016 resulted in his constituency being won by M. Varalakshmi.

References 

Desiya Murpokku Dravida Kazhagam politicians
Tamil Nadu MLAs 2011–2016
Living people
Year of birth missing (living people)